Qeshlaq-e Owzbak (also Romanized as Qeshlāq-e Owzbak; also known as Ozbak and Qeshlāq-e Ozbak) is a village in Qeshlaq Rural District, Abish Ahmad District, Kaleybar County, East Azerbaijan Province, Iran. At the 2006 census, its population was 559, in 113 families.

References 

Populated places in Kaleybar County